Ranti Dikgale (born 12 July 1987) is a South African athlete. He competed in the men's 4 × 400 metres relay event at the 2020 Summer Olympics held in Tokyo, Japan. In 2019, he won the silver medal in the men's 4 × 400 metres relay at the 2019 African Games held in Rabat, Morocco.

References

External links
 

1987 births
Living people
South African male sprinters
Athletes (track and field) at the 2019 African Games
African Games medalists in athletics (track and field)
African Games silver medalists for South Africa
Athletes (track and field) at the 2020 Summer Olympics
Olympic athletes of South Africa
People from Phalaborwa